Longitarsus ochroleucus is a species of beetle from Chrysomelidae family.

Description
The species is yellowish-white coloured, and has orange legs and antennae.

Distribution
The species can be found in Europe, including Northern England and South Sweden. It can also be found in Asia, including Asia Minor, the Caucasus, the Middle East, China and Nepal. The species is also common on the Canary Islands and in North Africa.

References

Beetles described in 1802
O
Beetles of Asia
Beetles of Europe
Taxa named by Thomas Marsham